Kirsanovka is a rural locality (a selo) and the administrative center of Kirsanovskoye Rural Settlement, Gribanovsky District, Voronezh Oblast, Russia. The population was 912 as of 2010. There are 17 streets.

Geography 
Kirsanovka is located 22 km west of Gribanovsky (the district's administrative centre) by road. Yemelyanovka is the nearest rural locality.

References 

Rural localities in Gribanovsky District